Straight from the N.O. is the second studio album by American rapper Choppa, released on March 4, 2003, through The New No Limit , Take Fo & Universal Records.  Production for the album was handled by "Henry The Man" Holden, Nik Cohn, Don Juan, Ke'Noe, Master P, Donald XL Robertson and Sinista. There was one single released from the album: "Choppa Style". It proved to be a success for Choppa, peaking at number 54 on the Billboard 200 and #17 on the Top R&B/Hip-Hop Albums, selling 95,000 copies its first week.

Background
Executive producers for Straight from the N.O. include Choppa, Donald XL Robertson and "Henry The Man" Holden.

Track listing

Charts

References 

2003 albums
Choppa albums
No Limit Records albums